Émile Belmont Mbouh Mbouh (born 30 May 1966) is a Cameroonian former footballer who played at both professional and international levels as a midfielder.

Club career
Born in Douala, Mbouh played club football for Union Douala, Diamant Yaoundé, Le Havre, Chênois, Vitória de Guimarães, Benfica e Castelo Branco, Ettifaq, Qatar SC, Perlis FA, Tiong Bahru United, Kuala Lumpur FA, Liaoning Tianrun and Sabah FA.

International career
Mbouh was a member of the Cameroon between 1985 and 1994, he had 46 caps and scored 2 goals. He participated at the 1990 FIFA World Cup and 1994 FIFA World Cup.

References

1966 births
Living people
Footballers from Douala
Cameroonian footballers
Cameroon international footballers
1990 FIFA World Cup players
1994 FIFA World Cup players
1986 African Cup of Nations players
1988 African Cup of Nations players
1992 African Cup of Nations players
Union Douala players
Diamant Yaoundé players
Le Havre AC players
CS Chênois players
Vitória S.C. players
Sport Benfica e Castelo Branco players
Ettifaq FC players
Qatar SC players
Perlis FA players
Tanjong Pagar United FC players
Kuala Lumpur City F.C. players
Liaoning F.C. players
Sabah F.C. (Malaysia) players
Association football midfielders
Cameroonian expatriate footballers
Cameroonian expatriate sportspeople in France
Expatriate footballers in France
Cameroonian expatriate sportspeople in Switzerland
Expatriate footballers in Switzerland
Cameroonian expatriate sportspeople in Portugal
Expatriate footballers in Portugal
Cameroonian expatriate sportspeople in Saudi Arabia
Expatriate footballers in Saudi Arabia
Cameroonian expatriate sportspeople in Qatar
Expatriate footballers in Qatar
Cameroonian expatriate sportspeople in Malaysia
Expatriate footballers in Malaysia
Cameroonian expatriate sportspeople in Singapore
Expatriate footballers in Singapore
Cameroonian expatriate sportspeople in China
Expatriate footballers in China
Ligue 2 players
Primeira Liga players
Saudi Professional League players
Qatar Stars League players